Chiara Siracusa better known by her mononym Chiara (born 25 September 1976), is a Maltese singer. She represented her country in the Eurovision Song Contest in 1998, 2005, and 2009 and is with a second and a third place the third most successful participant who never won the contest (behind Germany's Katja Ebstein and Wind).

Biography

Eurovision 1998 
In 1998, she won Malta's Song for Europe festival, the national pre-selection for Eurovision, with the gentle ballad "The One That I Love", which she then took to the contest in Birmingham.  With Eurovision being a national passion in a country that has so far never won the contest, much of Malta held its collective breath in the latter stages of the event as their entry held a joint lead with Israel, with only one country left to declare its vote.  But Chiara was to suffer heartbreak in the end, as Macedonia gave her no points at all, leaving her behind the victorious Dana International of Israel, and even pushing her narrowly into third place behind Imaani of the United Kingdom. That was still enough to qualify as Malta's best ever placing at the time, from the 1992 contest. Chiara told in a BBC interview two years later that she cried for several hours in the bathroom of her hotel suite after losing at Eurovision, but she came to see her high scoring as an achievement.

Eurovision 2005 
In 2005, aiming for another chance at Eurovision, Chiara re-entered the Song for Europe festival, and along with 21 other entries reached the final on 19 February with the song Angel, another ballad which this time she wrote and composed herself. For the first time, Malta's Eurovision entry was selected solely by a public vote. Chiara won with 11,935 phone calls, 566 ahead of her nearest rival Olivia Lewis, and so represented Malta at the Eurovision Song Contest 2005 in Kyiv, Ukraine.

Chiara had the distinction of joining an unusually extensive list of 2005 competitors who had competed previously in the contest, including Iceland's 1999 runner-up Selma, and Greece's Helena Paparizou, who in the 2001 contest was lead singer of third-placed Antique. Chiara came second in the Contest with 192 points, putting her ahead of Malta's only other Eurovision runner-up, Ira Losco and making "Angel" the most successful Maltese entry of all time.  One scholarly study has claimed that, were it not for the effects of regional "bloc" voting, Chiara would have won the Contest.

After the result in 2005, Chiara had been working a lot around Malta and abroad, most notably in Greece and Cyprus.. She hosted the Malta Song for Europe in 2008.

Eurovision 2009 
The loss of her father in 2008 became tough time for Chiara, but as a tribute to him she was even more determined to achieve further success. Chiara returned to the Malta Eurosong finals with a song composed by Belgian songwriters Gregory Bilsen and Marc Paelinck. On 7 February 2009, Chiara won the Maltese preselection for the Eurovision Song Contest 2009. She represented Malta in the first semi-final in Moscow with her song What If We on 12 May. She qualified to the grand final, held on 16 May, and finished 22nd in the final vote.

2010–present 
Siracusa was the spokesperson for Malta at the Eurovision Song Contest 2010, giving the points awarded from the Maltese voting in the final. In June 2010, she released the Official Malta Gay Pride Anthem, "Believe (We Are One)".

Discography
1998: Shades Of One
2000: What You Want
2003: Covering Diversions
2005: Here I Am
2009: What If We

Charted Singles

Eurovision entries
"The One That I Love"
"Angel"
"What If We"

References

External links 

Chiara Siracusa on Myspace

1976 births
Living people
Eurovision Song Contest entrants for Malta
21st-century Maltese women singers
21st-century Maltese singers
Eurovision Song Contest entrants of 1998
Eurovision Song Contest entrants of 2005
Eurovision Song Contest entrants of 2009
Maltese pop singers
Maltese singer-songwriters
20th-century Maltese women singers
20th-century Maltese singers
Maltese people of Italian descent
English-language writers from Malta